Villa Park High School (VPHS) is a four-year suburban public high school located in the city of Villa Park, California, United States. It was built in 1964 and is one of four comprehensive high schools in the Orange Unified School District. The campus serves students residing in Villa Park and portions of the cities of Orange and Anaheim.

Enrollment at VPHS (for the 2020-2021 school year) was 2,185 students. The ethnic breakdown of the student population was 10.4% Asian, 51.5% Hispanic, 0.8% African American and 32.1% white (non-Hispanic). The professional staff includes 88 teachers, six counselors, a library media specialist, a career adviser, an activities director, and three administrators. A dedicated classified staff also supports the school program.

The school Academic Performance Index (API) for the 2011–2012 school year was 815, a six-point increase over the previous year.

The regular school day begins at 9:25 AM and ends at 3:25 PM. A small number of earlier classes are available for students who want to begin and finish their school day earlier. These "zero period" classes meet from 8:30 to 9:20 AM. A hybrid block schedule has been implemented for the 2022-2023 school year, with students attending all classes on Mondays, then alternating odd and even block periods Tuesday through Friday.

Athletics
The school mascot is the Spartan, and its colors are black, silver, and Columbia blue. Students at Villa Park High School may compete in the following sports:

Baseball
Basketball
Cross country
Diving
Football 
Golf 
Ice hockey
Soccer
Softball
Surf
Swimming
Tennis
Track & field
Volleyball
Water polo 
Wrestling

Visual and performing arts 
Villa Park offers a variety of visual and performing arts that students may take throughout their four years of high school.

Vocal Music
Advanced Dance Company
Junior Dance Company
Dance Ensemble
Cheerleading
Marching Band 
Instrumental Music
Choral Music
Theatre

Academics 
Villa Park offers a variety of Advanced Placement® (AP) courses and students may take any of the following courses: 

 AP Art History
 AP Music Theory
 AP Studio Art 2-D Design
 AP Studio Art 3-D Design
 AP Studio Art Drawing
 AP Seminar
 AP Research
 AP English Language and Composition
 AP English Literature and Composition
 AP Human Geography
 AP Macroeconomics
 AP Psychology
 AP US Government and Politics
 AP US History
 AP World History
 AP European History (in 2018-19)
 AP Biology
 AP Calculus AB
 AP Calculus BC
 AP Chemistry
 AP Computer Science Principles
 AP Environmental Science
 AP Physics C: Electricity and Magnetism
 AP Physics C: Mechanics
 AP Physics 1: Algebra-Based
 AP French Language and Culture
 AP German Language and Culture
 AP Spanish Language and Culture
 AP Spanish Literature and Culture

Notable alumni
Robbie Martin Former NFL Football Player Detroit Lions and Indianapolis Colts.
Deborah Stall Nelson – Author and book coach
Rebecca Black – Youtuber and singer
Aaron Boone – former MLB infielder; ESPN Baseball Tonight analyst; manager of the New York Yankees 2017–present
Kevin Costner – actor
Dave Leeper – former MLB outfielder, Kansas City Royals (1985 World Series Champions)
Pat McInally – All-Pro NFL punter, Cincinnati Bengals
Paul Moyer – professional football player, Seattle Seahawks
Jason Sanders – NFL kicker, Miami Dolphins
Monte Scheinblum – 1992 US National and World Long Driving Champion
Jim Sorensen – world and American Masters record holder in the 800 metres and 1500 metres
Mark Trumbo – MLB baseball player, Baltimore Orioles

References

External links
 

Educational institutions established in 1964
High schools in Orange County, California
Public high schools in California
Education in Orange, California
1964 establishments in California